Godfrey Beetock Stephen (born 22 August 2000) is a Nigerian professional footballer who plays as a defender for Russian club Volga Ulyanovsk.

Career

Club
In January 2020, Stephen signed a new two-year contract with Isloch Minsk Raion, until the end of 2021. 

In February 2021, Stephen joined Jagiellonia Białystok on a contract until the end of 2024. On 18 December 2021, Dinamo Tbilisi announced the year-long loan signing of Stephen. After his loan had concluded, he terminated his contract with Jagiellonia by mutual consent on 1 February 2023.

Career statistics

Club

References

External links 
 
 
 Player's profile at pressball.by

2000 births
Living people
Sportspeople from Jos
Nigerian footballers
Association football defenders
FC Isloch Minsk Raion players
FC Dinamo Tbilisi players
Jagiellonia Białystok players
FC Volga Ulyanovsk players
Belarusian Premier League players
Ekstraklasa players
III liga players
Erovnuli Liga players
Nigerian expatriate footballers
Expatriate footballers in Belarus
Expatriate footballers in Poland
Expatriate footballers in Georgia (country)
Expatriate footballers in Russia
Nigerian expatriate sportspeople in Belarus
Nigerian expatriate sportspeople in Poland
Nigerian expatriate sportspeople in Georgia (country)
Nigerian expatriate sportspeople in Russia